Numerous world records and Olympic records were set in various events at the 1988 Winter Olympics in Calgary.

Ski Jumping 
Finnish ski jumper Matti Nykänen became the first person to win both the 70 metre and 90 metre events in a single Olympic Games.

Speed Skating 
All of the long track world (WR) and Olympic records (OR) that occurred during these Games were later broken at succeeding Winter Olympics and other world events.

References

Official reports
 

1988 Winter Olympics
1988 Winter Olympics